Disappearing in Airports is the sixth studio album by rock band Candlebox. It was released on April 22, 2016, on Pavement Entertainment. It is also the first album without original guitarist Peter Klett, and has only singer Kevin Martin left from the original lineup. Former Pearl Jam drummer Dave Krusen returned for the album.

Track listing
All tracks by Candlebox.

Personnel
Kevin Martin – lead vocals
Mike Leslie – lead guitar
Brian Quinn – rhythm guitar
Adam Kury – bass
Dave Krusen – drums

Charts

References

Candlebox albums
2016 albums